Weinegg is a quarter in District 8 of Zürich.

Geography and demographics 
Weinegg was formerly a part of Riesbach municipality, which was incorporated into Zürich in 1893. The quarter has a population of 4,951 distributed on an area of 1.72 km².

Enzenbühl and Rehalp cemeteries 
In 1902 Enzenbühl was, after the old Neumünster and Rehalp cemeteries, the third expansion phase for the growing needs of northeastern Zürich. Arnold Geiser, the city's chief engineer, designed an architecturally simple cemetery with longitudinal and transverse axes, surrounded by high, circular walls. At the highest area of the westward sloping plant, Geiser positioned there the abdication chapel that was built in the Gothic Revival style. In 1934 the cemetery grounds have been expanded to its present size.
Friedhof Enzenbühl, a cemetery those area is shared with the municipality of Zollikon, became the final resting place of some known respectively popular people, among them Inigo Gallo, César Keiser and Margrit Rainer.

Trivia 
The fictitious 2007 Swiss mystery film Marmorea was filmed among others, in the Burghölzli sanatory in the Weinegg district, on the Limmat River near Technopark Zürich, at the Limmatquai promenade, and on the Münsterbrücke river crossing towards Münsterhof.

Gallery

References

External links 

District 8 of Zürich